Sergio Fernández Roda (born 1 April 1993) is a Spanish track and field athlete. He competed at the 2016 European Championships in Amsterdam, Netherlands, where he won the silver medal in the 400 metres hurdles event. Later that year he represented his country at the 2016 Olympic Games where he narrowly missed the final with a new national record in the semifinals.

Fernández represented his country in qualifying rounds at the 2012 World Junior Championships in Athletics, 2014 European Athletics Championships and the 2015 European Athletics U23 Championships.

Competition record

Personal bests

Outdoor

References

External links 
 
 
 
 

1993 births
Living people
European Athletics Championships medalists
Spanish male hurdlers
Athletes (track and field) at the 2016 Summer Olympics
Olympic athletes of Spain
People from Cuenca de Pamplona
World Athletics Championships athletes for Spain
Spanish Athletics Championships winners
Athletes (track and field) at the 2020 Summer Olympics
Sportspeople from Navarre
21st-century Spanish people